Mosgrove is an unincorporated community in Rayburn Township, Armstrong County, Pennsylvania, United States.

History
A post office called Mosgrove was established in 1886 and remained in operation until 1938.

References

Unincorporated communities in Armstrong County, Pennsylvania
Unincorporated communities in Pennsylvania